Hugo Ferdinand Boss (8 July 1885 – 9 August 1948) was a German businessman. He was the founder of the fashion house Hugo Boss AG.

He was an active member of the Nazi Party from 1931, and remained so until Nazi Germany's capitulation. His clothing company also utilized forced labour drawn from German-occupied territories and POW camps, to manufacture uniforms for the SS and later the Wehrmacht.

Early life
Boss was born in Metzingen, Kingdom of Württemberg, to Luise (née Münzenmayer) and Heinrich Boss, the youngest of five children. He apprenticed as a merchant, did his military service from 1903 to 1905, and then worked in a weaving mill in Konstanz. He took over his parents' lingerie shop in Metzingen in 1908, as heir. In 1914, he was mobilized into the army and served through World War I, ending it as a corporal.

Hugo Boss company
Boss founded his own clothing company in Metzingen in 1923 and then opened a factory in 1924, initially with two partners. The company produced shirts and jackets and later work clothing, sportswear, and raincoats. In the 1930s, it produced uniforms for the SA, the SS, the Hitler Youth, the postal service, the national railroad, and later the Wehrmacht.

Support of Nazism

Boss joined the Nazi Party in 1931, two years before Adolf Hitler came to power. By the third quarter of 1932, the all-black SS uniform (to replace the SA brown shirts) was designed by SS-Oberführer Prof. Karl Diebitsch, and graphic designer Walter Heck, who had no affiliation with the company. The Hugo Boss company produced these black uniforms along with the brown SA shirts and the black-and-brown uniforms of the Hitler Youth. Some workers were French and Polish prisoners of war forced into labour. In 1999, US lawyers acting on behalf of Holocaust survivors started legal proceedings against the Hugo Boss company over the use of slave labour during the war. The misuse of 140 Polish and 40 French forced workers led to an apology by the company.

After World War II, the denazification process saw Boss initially labeled as an "activist, supporter and beneficiary" of national-socialism, which resulted in a heavy fine, also stripping him of his voting rights and capacity to run a business. However, this initial ruling was appealed, and Boss was re-labeled as a "follower", a category with a less severe punishment. Nevertheless, the effects of the ban led to Boss's son-in-law, Eugen Holy, taking over both the ownership and the running of the company.

Death
Boss died in 1948 of a tooth abscess in Württemberg-Hohenzollern, Allied-occupied Germany. He was 63.

References

External links

1885 births
1948 deaths
Förderndes Mitglied der SS
German chief executives
German company founders
20th-century German businesspeople
German fashion businesspeople
German fashion designers
German Army personnel of World War I
Menswear designers
Nazi Party members
People from Metzingen
People from the Kingdom of Württemberg